Heat Up may refer to:

"Heat Up", single by Roll Deep from In at the Deep End 2005, released on Shake a Leg
Heat Up (Ken Hirai song)
SD Heat Up!! game from Slam Dunk (manga)